Sensation is a British mystery thriller film directed by Martin Grof. The film stars Eugene Simon, Emily Wyatt and Jennifer Martin and was distributed in the US by Vertical Entertainment. It was shot on location in London and Suffolk in 2019 and had a limited US theatrical release in 2021.

Cast 

 Eugene Simon as Andrew Cooper
 Emily Wyatt as Nadia
 Jennifer Martin as May
 Marybeth Havens as Rebecca
 Alastair G. Cumming as Dr. Daniel Marinus
 Anil Desai as Shaan
 Kai Francis Lewis as Yuri
 Alexander Reid as Ernesto

Release 
Sensation was released on December 31, 2021 in the US. The film secured a limited theatrical release across the US.

Reception 
On the review aggregator website Rotten Tomatoes, 13% of 8 critics' reviews are positive.

The Guardian's Phil Hoad, described the film as "convoluted, untidy sci-fi conspiracy yarn". Film Threat's Rob Rector remarked "Those who seek their sci-fi with a more cerebral slant will find quite a bit to admire here.", praising the cast performances and Grof's direction.

References 

2021 films
British mystery thriller films
2020s mystery thriller films